John Currie was a U.S. soccer player who earned two caps with the U.S. national team in 1937.  His first game with the national team in a 7-2 loss to Mexico on September 12, 1937.  His second game was two weeks later, a 7-3 loss to Mexico.

References

External links
 

American soccer players
United States men's international soccer players
Association football midfielders
Possibly living people
Year of birth missing